A leviton, named after Leonid Levitov, is a collective excitation of a single electron within a metal. It has been mostly studied in two-dimensional electron gases alongside quantum point contacts. The main feature is that the excitation produces an electron pulse without the creation of electron holes. The time-dependence of the pulse is described by a Lorentzian distribution created by a pulsed electric potential.   

Levitons have also been described in graphene.

References

Quasiparticles